Brooke Paige "Mikey" Anderson (born 15 August 1981) is an Australian actress, who started her career as a child actress when she played the character Claire Fielding on the Australian series E Street, and has appeared in two episodes ("?" and "Live Together, Die Alone") of the American series Lost.

Anderson trained at Gala Productions run by her mother Lynda Keane and father Greg Anderson in Sydney Australia.  Her parents also had a very popular dance troupe during the 1970s, 1980s and 1990s called The Keane Kids. This dance troupe performed on numerous television shows, Royal Command Performances and overseas productions. This dance troupe had helped train and form a number of well known Australian actors and theatre performers.

Biography
She appeared as a child actor in the Australian soap opera E Street, which aired on the Ten Network from 1989 to 1994. She was written out of the series after writers had trouble coming up with storylines for her character. When Anderson was 12, she released a single and music video called "Step Back (Peace not War)". She has had lead roles in independent films including as Self Inflicted, Sum of Existence, Short Side Of Nothing, and Good Chemistry. She directed and co-produced an independent film Off The Ledge, with her directing partner Dawn Higginbotham.

Anderson finished post-production on her feature film directorial debut Off the Ledge under her production company Cordova Pictures with producing partner Dawn Higginbotham and her Australian production company Gala Films. She is in active development on three feature films; a feature remake, and two pilots. Cordova Pictures went into production on the feature film "Passing Through" in 2008.

Filmography

Film

Television

External links
 
 Brooke's Official Website
 Brooke's Production Company – Cordova Pictures
 Off The Ledge Movie

1981 births
Living people
Actresses from Sydney
Australian television actresses
Australian child actresses